André Valardy (born André Knoblauch, '17 May 1938 – 30 April 2007) was a Belgian actor, director and humorist.

Filmography

References

External links

1938 births
2007 deaths
Belgian male actors
Belgian film directors
Belgian humorists
Actors from Antwerp
Mass media people from Antwerp